is a railway station on the Muroran Main Line in Tōyako, Hokkaido, Japan, operated by Hokkaido Railway Company (JR Hokkaido). It is numbered "H41".

Lines

Tōya Station is served by the Muroran Main Line.

Adjacent stations

History
The station opened on 10 September 1928, initially named . It was renamed Tōya Station on 1 November 1962. With the privatization of JNR on 1 April 1987, the station came under the control of JR Hokkaido.

Surrounding area
 National Route 37
 National Route 230
 Lake Tōya
 Mount Usu
 Hokkaido Abuta High School

References

Railway stations in Hokkaido Prefecture
Stations of Hokkaido Railway Company
Railway stations in Japan opened in 1928